The Caucasian goby (Ponticola constructor) is a species of goby native to rivers of the Caucasus draining to the Black Sea in Europe and Asia.  This species is strictly a fresh water species and will not enter brackish water.  It can reach a length of  SL.

References 

Ponticola
Fish described in 1840
Freshwater fish of Western Asia
Fish of Russia
Fish of Georgia (country)